Methylpentene is an alkene with a molecular formula C6H12. The prefix "methyl-" is derived from the fact that there is a methyl(CH3) branch, the word root "-pent-" is derived from the fact that there are 5 carbon atoms in the parent chain, while the "-ene" suffix denotes that there is a double bond present, as per IUPAC nomenclature. Following are the possible structural isomers of methylpentane:

See also
 Polymethylpentene

References

Alkenes